is a ballet made at the New York City Ballet by ballet master John Taras to eponymous 1952 music composed by Georges Auric, Arthur Honegger, Daniel-Lesur, Alexis Roland-Manuel, Francis Poulenc, Henri Sauguet and Germaine Tailleferre, after a theme from André Campra's 1717 opera Camille, reine des Volsques. The premiere took place December 1, 1966 at the New York State Theater, Lincoln Center.

Original cast 
 Violette Verdy
 Mimi Paul
 Marnee Morris
 Patricia Neary
 Melissa Hayden
 Arthur Mitchell

Reviews 
 "Dance: La guirlande de Campra by John Taras; A Good Performance of a Weak Ballet" by Clive Barnes, The New York Times, December 2, 1966

Ballets by John Taras
1966 ballet premieres
New York City Ballet repertory